Sybille Brüdgam (born 4 December 1965) is a German former footballer who played as a midfielder, appearing for the East Germany women's national team in their first and only match on 9 May 1990.

Career statistics

International

References

External links
 

1965 births
Living people
People from Potsdam-Mittelmark
Footballers from Brandenburg
People from Bezirk Potsdam
German women's footballers
East German women's footballers
East Germany women's international footballers
Women's association football midfielders
1. FFC Turbine Potsdam players